Jody Williams (born 1956) is an American artist, writer, and teacher. She creates and publishes artist's books under the imprint Flying Paper Press in her studio in Minneapolis, Minnesota. She works in a range of media, including artist's books, collages, drawings, etchings, bronze sculptures, and mixed-media boxes that she calls not-empty boxes.

Williams teaches printmaking and book arts at the Minneapolis College of Art and Design and the Minnesota Center for Book Arts.

Early life and education 
Williams grew up near Chicago. She learned to write her name when she was four years old so she could get her own library card, and her love of books eventually led her to making them herself. She credits her love for creating order out of chaos to growing up with five siblings in a family that moved four times before she was ten. In a 2016 artist statement, she wrote, "I found it necessary to keep my possessions small, contained, and protected. As an adult, the compulsion to collect, organize and find containers for things has remained with me, and has directed much of my artwork."

Williams earned a BA cum laude from Carleton College in Northfield, Minnesota, in 1978, and an MFA in printmaking from the Rochester Institute of Technology in Rochester, New York.

Work and career 
Williams is perhaps best known for what art critic of the Minneapolis Star Tribune newspaper Mary Abbe called "meticulously designed miniature books". Williams also constructs intricate multi-part boxes and other containers that display artifacts and natural specimens, along the lines of the 17th-century Wunderkammer, or cabinet of wonders. Her work shows the influence of libraries, books, and research. The inclusion in her art of feathers, grasses, flower petals, seedpods, and other fragile fragments that Williams collects on walks and bike rides reflects her passionate interest in the natural world.

Observing, Thinking, Breathing: The Nancy Gast Riss Carleton '77 Cabinet of Wonders, permanently on display at the Gould Library at Carleton College in Northfield, Minnesota, is one of Williams's most complex works. The 48-inch-wide cabinet is divided into "observing", "thinking", and "breathing" sections. Reflecting the liberal-arts environment, it includes a tiny Periodic Table of Elements and beakers; a miniature desk with typewriter and a copy of The Ambassadors by Henry James on it; and samples of water, maple seeds, dried thistles, and other specimens Williams collected from the prairie land and the arboretum on campus.

In 2011 the Twin Cities PBS television show Minnesota Originals featured Williams and her book Small Orders,  a tiny book of prints of invertebrates.

Besides teaching at the Minneapolis College of Art and Design and Minnesota Center for Book Arts, Williams also teaches and lectures across Europe and the United States, including at the University of Iowa Center for the Book.

Form+Content Gallery 
Williams is an early member of Form+Content Gallery, an artist-owned and run gallery in downtown Minneapolis. Members show their own artwork and also curate shows from nonmember artists. Unlike most commercial or institutional galleries, Form+Content allows artists to retain control of their show.

Selected solo and group exhibitions 
 2016 – Shadows and Dust, Form+Content Gallery, Minneapolis, Minnesota; Circumstantial Evidence, solo exhibition at Augsburg College, Minneapolis
 2015 – Codex International Book Arts Fair, Berkeley, California
 2013–2016 – The Art of the Book, Canadian Bookbinders and Book Artists Guild

Selected public collections 
 Minneapolis Institute of Art, Minneapolis, MN
 Minnesota Historical Society, Saint Paul, MN
 San Francisco Museum of Modern Art, San Francisco, CA
 Yale University Library, New Haven, CT
 Walker Art Center, Minneapolis, MN

Awards and nominations 
 2013 and 2016 – Minnesota State Arts Board Artist Initiative Grant
 2008 – Minnesota Book Artist Award, inaugural recipient
 1995 – Minnesota Center for Book Arts/Jerome Foundation Book Arts Fellowship

References

External links 
 Flying Paper Press Jody Williams's website
 "Jody Williams",  Twin Cities PBS (TPT) video, 05:50, Minnesota Original
 Form+Content Gallery
 Observing, Thinking, Breathing: The Nancy Gast Riss '77 Carleton Cabinet of Wonders

Carleton College alumni
Living people
Rochester Institute of Technology alumni
American women artists
1956 births
Minneapolis College of Art and Design faculty
American printmakers
American women printmakers
American women academics
21st-century American women artists